The following is an outline of topics related to the Republic of Honduras.

Honduras
Honduras
Culture of Honduras
Demographics of Honduras
Departments of Honduras
Economy of Honduras
Geography of Honduras
History of Honduras
ISO 3166-1 alpha-2 country code for Honduras: HN
ISO 3166-1 alpha-3 country code for Honduras: HND
ISO 3166-2:HN region codes for Honduras
Music of Honduras
Rivers of Honduras
Human rights in Honduras

Politics
Politics of Honduras
President of Honduras
List of political parties in Honduras
Elections in Honduras
Liberalism in Honduras
Communications in Honduras
Transportation in Honduras
West-Wind (Honduran Presidential Plane)
Flag of Honduras
Foreign relations of Honduras
2009 Honduran constitutional crisis
Arnoldo José Avilés García

Military
Military of Honduras
2009 Honduran coup d'état
Football War

List of famous Hondurans

Óscar Acosta
Elvia Alvarado
Oscar Álvarez, former Minister of Security
Ramón Amaya Amador
Eduardo Bähr
Augusto Coello
Argentina Díaz Lozano
Julio Escoto
America Ferrera, American actress of Honduran origin
Lucila Gamero de Medina
Alfonso Guillén Zelaya
Porfirio Lobo, President of Honduras
Ricardo Maduro, former President of Honduras
Carlos Mencia (American comedian born in San Pedro Sula)
El Menor Menor, Honduran Singer from La Ceiba
Juan Ramón Molina
Sir Salvador Moncada
Visitación Padilla
Carlos Pavón, former professional footballer.
Satcha Pretto
Carlos Roberto Reina
Óscar Andrés Rodríguez Maradiaga
Ramón Rosa
Neida Sandoval (born in Minas de Oro)
Roberto Sosa (poet)
Clementina Suárez
Froylán Turcios
Hype Williams, music video and film director
José Zúñiga, Actor

Cities and important towns and places
 Tegucigalpa (Capital)
 Chamelecón
 Choluteca
 Comayagua
 Danlí
 El Progreso
 Gracias
 Guanaja
 Juticalpa
 La Ceiba
 La Esperanza
 La Mosquitia
 Nueva Ocotepeque
 Minas de Oro
 Omoa
 Puerto Castilla
 Puerto Cortés
 Puerto Lempira
 Roatán
 Sambo Creek
 San Pedro Sula
 Santa Rosa de Copán
 Siguatepeque
 Tela
 Tocoa
 Trujillo

Football (soccer)
Liga Profesional de Honduras
Hispano FC
C.D. Platense
Universidad NAH
Municipal Valencia
C.D. Victoria
C.D. Vida
Liga de Ascenso Honduras
C.D. Arsenal
Social Sol
Deportes Savio
Atlético Olanchano
Motagua Reservas
Juticalpa Tulin
Olimpia Reservas
C.D. Federal
Honduras Salzburg
Honduras05-06apertura
Honduras04-05clausura
Honduras04-05apertura
Honduras03-04clausura
Honduras03-04apertura
Honduras 02-03 clausura
Edgar Álvarez
Víctor Coello
Estadio Olímpico Metropolitano

Ancient cities and important ruins
 Cerro Palenque
 Copán
 La Travesía

Other geographic features
Bay Islands
Caribbean Sea
Gulf of Fonseca
Gulf of Honduras
Lake Yojoa
Mosquito Coast
Pacific Ocean

Administrative subdivisions
 Atlántida (department)
 Choluteca (department)
 Colón (department)
 Comayagua (department)
 Copán (department)
 Cortés (department)
 El Paraíso (department)
 Francisco Morazán (department)
 Gracias a Dios (department)
 Intibucá (department)
 Islas de la Bahía (department)
 La Paz (Honduran department)
 Lempira (department)
 Ocotepeque (department)
 Olancho (department)
 Santa Bárbara (department)
 Valle (department)
 Yoro (department)

Other
Adjacent countries:

.hn Internet country code top-level domain for Honduras
Football War
Contras
Hurricane Mitch
Virgin of Suyapa
United Provinces of Central America

See also

 

List of Central America-related topics
List of international rankings
Lists of country-related topics

External links

Extensive List of Honduras Maps, by Region

Honduras Maps

 
Outlines of countries
Wikipedia outlines